Revonah Hill is a mountain in Sullivan County, New York. It is located northwest of Liberty. Grants Hill is located northwest and Chuck Hill is located south-southwest of Revonah Hill.

References

Mountains of Sullivan County, New York
Mountains of New York (state)